A ring girl is a woman who enters the ring between rounds of a combat sport, carrying a sign that displays the number of the upcoming round. Ring girls are often seen in boxing, kickboxing and mixed martial arts.

History
Ring girls first appeared in a 1965 edition of Ring Magazine. The magazine published a photo of a Las Vegas model holding a sign at a boxing match. Boxing promotions adopted the concept of ring girls

In modern combat sports

Professional wrestling

In professional wrestling, ring girls are attendants who remove the entrance gear (such as jackets, robes, and other clothing) and championship belts from the ring after a wrestler takes them off before his match. Throughout the 1980s, World Wrestling Entertainment employed ring girls known as the Federettes. Since its inception in 2002, Total Nonstop Action Wrestling has featured various independent female wrestlers and valets as ring girls.

During the first year of WWF Monday Night Raw, WWE featured traditional boxing-style ring girls who carried signs featuring various Raw-themed slogans in the ring between matches.

MMA
Playboy is an American entertainment magazine. Here is a list of notable ring girls who have posed for Playboy.

Controversies

Allegations of sexism
Some sports journalists claim that ring girls are unnecessary. Ring girls first appeared in boxing. Having half-naked women at the games provides sexual attraction for the male audience. In contrast, some people see ring girls as a harmless tradition. Boxing promoter Lisa Elovich calls the practice "part of the show."

"Ring boys" or "ring guys" have been proposed for women's matches. Pro-boxer Mikaela Laurén said "I want a number boy. I think that's only fair, and I'm sure it will give the women in the audience some pleasure as well."

While all-female fighting promotion Invicta FC utilizes ring girls, the promotion brought in UFC fighter and sometimes model Elias Theodorou to serve as a ring boy at Invicta FC 28. Theodorou received criticism, however, for using the occasion to promote sponsors.

Payments
There were speculations that ring girls are paid more than some female athletes. In 2015, former UFC bantamweight champion Ronda Rousey protested. "Do you think her walking in circles," argued Rousey, "is worth more (than fighters)? ... either the ring card girls are paid too much, or the fighters aren't paid enough." UFC ring girls are reputedly paid $18,000 a year. This excludes jobs outside the UFC, like modeling. UFC ring girl Arianny Celeste protested, calling Rousey a "big bully". "I think people don't realise how much work it is to be a model," argued Celeste, "Trying being like a live mannequin and having clients put you in a million different outfits... It's not as easy as it looks... Not a lot of people would know that unless they were in my shoes."

See also
 Pin up girls
 Podium girl
 Promotional model

References

Boxing culture
Entertainment occupations
Gendered occupations
Martial arts culture
Modeling (profession)
Professional wrestling slang
Sports occupations and roles
Female beauty
Wrestling culture